Andrew Clarke (born 1954) is an Australian actor most known for his television work. Andrew Clarke was one of the most popular Australian actors in the 1980s and 1990s. He is also a two-time Logie winner.

Career
Andrew Clarke began his career in theatre. His theatre credits include Macbeth, The Winter's Tale, Arsenic and Old Lace, The Cherry Orchard, Long Day's Journey into Night, The Glass Menagerie, The Devil's Advocate, Waiting for Godot and Under Milk Wood.

He has had several high-profile roles in television movies, series and mini-series, including starring in the popular series Banjo Paterson's The Man From Snowy River ("Snowy River: The McGregor Saga") as Matt McGregor for four seasons from 1993-1996. He also starred in an episode of Halifax f.p. in 1999.

Other television roles included a short stint in soap opera Prisoner, where (in 1982) he played the role of Judy Bryant's son-in-law Geoff Maynard, and the ongoing role of Terry Hansen in soap opera Sons and Daughters (appearing in episodes between 1983 and 1984). In 1992, he acted as Sonny Hammond in The Adventures of Skippy, which was short lived and ran for one season with 39 episodes.

Other major roles have been in the 1985 mini-series Anzacs, in which he won the 1985 best actor Silver Logie, the 1986 mini-series Sword of Honour and the 1985 mini-series about Charles Kingsford Smith called A Thousand Skies, in which he appeared as Charles Ulm.

Clarke had a starring role as sleuth Simon Templar in The Saint in Manhattan in 1987. There was a one-hour pilot episode that aired on CBS. It did not make the fall schedule; instead, CBS decided to show it and have viewers call in and vote to put it on the schedule. About 44,000 people called in, with more than 40,000 of them voting in favour of the show. These numbers did not sway CBS, especially since the show did not fare well against whatever was playing on the other two networks that night, and it declined to purchase any future episodes.

Clarke also appeared in the movie Les Patterson Saves The World in 1987 and portrayed Laurence Olivier in Blonde. He has also had roles in SeaChange, Halifax f.p., and Always Greener In late 2005 he completed a four-month stint on soap opera Neighbours, playing Alex Kinski.

Clarke portrayed Horatio Wills, father of cricketer and Australian rules football pioneer Tom Wills, in a documentary about the latter's life. It was first screened publicly in 2014 and had its television debut in 2016.

Clarke played football at a high level, is a keen tennis player and runs. He was romantically involved with Victoria Tennant, an actress and former wife of actor Steve Martin in the mid nineties.

Awards 

Andrew Clarke has won two Logie Awards. The awards were for:
 Most Popular Actor in a miniseries for his role in Anzacs
 Most Popular Actor in a miniseries for his role in Sword of Honour

References

External links

1954 births
Australian male film actors
Australian male soap opera actors
Australian male stage actors
Living people
Logie Award winners
Male actors from Adelaide
20th-century Australian male actors
21st-century Australian male actors